Vadim Slivchenko (born March 28, 1970) is a Ukrainian retired professional ice hockey player.

Slivchenko competed at the 1999 and 2001 IIHF World Championships as a member of the Ukraine men's national ice hockey team. He also competed with Team Ukraine at the 2002 Winter Olympics.

Career statistics

Regular season and playoffs

International

References

External links

1970 births
Living people
Chatham Wheels players
EHC Freiburg players
ETC Crimmitschau players
Färjestad BK players
Frankfurt Lions players
Greensboro Monarchs players
Houston Aeros (1994–2013) players
Krefeld Pinguine players
Schwenninger Wild Wings players
Sokil Kyiv players
Sportspeople from Kharkiv
Ukrainian ice hockey right wingers
Wheeling Nailers players
Wheeling Thunderbirds players
Wiener EV players
Olympic ice hockey players of Ukraine
Ice hockey players at the 2002 Winter Olympics
Portland Rage players
Sacramento River Rats players
Ukrainian expatriate sportspeople in Canada
Ukrainian expatriate sportspeople in the United States